Grammatica is a C# and Java parser generator. Its strength is its separation of grammar and other source code.

See also

JavaCC
SableCC
Coco/R
ANTLR
Modular Syntax Definition Formalism

References

External links 
 Grammatica home page
 Grammatica project page

Free compilers and interpreters
Parser generators